Walter Elliott (November 19, 1903 – August 10, 1984) was an American sound editor who won Best Sound Editing at the 1963 Academy Awards. He was the first person to win this award. He won for It's a Mad, Mad, Mad, Mad World.

Selected filmography
It's a Mad, Mad, Mad, Mad World (1963)
Judgment at Nuremberg (1961)
The Defiant Ones (1958)
Mighty Joe Young (1949)
The Son of Kong (1933)
King Kong (1933)

References

External links

1903 births
1984 deaths
Best Sound Editing Academy Award winners
American sound editors
People from Des Moines, Iowa